The Shahab-3 (meaning "meteor-3") is a liquid-propelled medium-range ballistic missile (MRBM) developed by Iran and based on the North Korean Nodong-1. It was tested from 1998 to 2003 and added to the military arsenal on 7 July 2003, with an official unveiling by Ayatollah Khamenei on July 20. With an accuracy of 140 m CEP, the Shahab-3 missile is primarily effective against large, soft targets (like military airfields). Given the Shahab-3’s payload capacity, it would likely be capable of delivering nuclear warheads. According to the IAEA, Iran in the early 2000s may have explored various fuzing, arming and firing systems to make the Shahab-3 more capable of reliably delivering a nuclear warhead.

The forerunners to this missile include the Shahab-1 and Shahab-2. In 2007, the then-Iranian Defence Minister Admiral Shamkhani has denied that Iran plans to develop a Shahab-4. Some successors to the Shahab have longer range and are also more maneuverable.

Operating under the Sanam Industrial Group (Department 140), which is part of the Defense Industries Organization of Iran, the Shahid Hemmat Industrial Group (SHIG), led the development of the Shahab missile.

In 2019, the US Defense Intelligence Agency described the Shahab 3 as "the mainstay of Iran’s MRBM force". US Air Force National Air and Space Intelligence Center estimates that as of June 2017 fewer than 50 launchers were operationally deployed.

Shahab-3 missiles are considered as obsolete and are being progressively changed for their more recent upgrades of Shahab family missiles such as the Ghadr-110H and Emad missile.

Variants
Shahab is the name of a class of loosely related Iranian missiles, service time of 1988–present, which comes in six variants: Shahab-1, Shahab-2, Shahab-3, Shahab-4, Shahab-5, and Shahab-6.

Shahab-3A
The range of the Shahab-3A is about 1,500 kilometers. According to the New York Times, the Shahab-3A was no longer in production as of 2008.

Shahab-3B

The Shahab-3B differs from the basic production variant. It has improvements to its guidance system and warhead with a greater range, a few small changes on the missile body, and a new re-entry vehicle whose terminal guidance system and rocket-nozzle steering method are completely different from the Shahab-3A's spin-stabilized re-entry vehicle.

The new re-entry vehicle uses a triconic aeroshell geometry (or "baby bottle" design) which improves the overall lift to drag ratio for the re-entry vehicle. This allows greater range maneuverability which can result in better precision.

The rocket-nozzle control system allows the missile to change its trajectory several times during re-entry and even terminal phase, effectively preventing interceptor guidance via trajectory prediction by early warning radar—a method nearly all long range ABM systems use. As a high-speed ballistic missile and pre-mission fueling capability, the Shahab-3 has an extremely short launch/impact time ratio. This means that the INS/gyroscope guidance would also remain relatively accurate until impact (important, given the fact that the gyroscopes tend to lose accuracy with longer flights). However, the accuracy of the missile is largely speculative and cannot be confidently predicted for wartime situations.

These improvements would increase the Shahab-3B's survivability against ABM systems such as Israel's Arrow 2 missile defence system (though its ability to overcome Arrow is very questionable) as well as being used for precision attacks against high-value targets such as command, control, and communications centres.

Shahab-3C and D
Little is known about Shahab-3C and Shahab-3D. From what can be gathered, the missiles have an improved precision, navigation system, and a longer range. The missiles were indigenously developed, and are being mass-produced. Iran had in 2008 a production capacity of 70 units per year.

Galleries

History and tests
The Shahab-3 was first seen in public on 25 September 1998, in Azadi Square, Tehran, in a parade held to commemorate the Iranian Sacred Defence Week.

Iran has conducted at least six test flights of the Shahab-3. During the first one, in July 1998, the missile reportedly exploded in mid-air during the latter portion of its flight; U.S. officials wondered whether the test was a failure or the explosion was intentional. A second, successful test took place in July 2000. In September 2000, Iran conducted a third test, in which the missile reportedly exploded shortly after launch. In May 2002, Iran conducted another successful test, leading then-Iranian Defense Minister Ali Shamkhani to say the test improved the Shahab-3's "power and accuracy". Another successful test reportedly occurred in July 2002. On 7 July 2003, the foreign ministry spokesman said that Iran had completed a final test of the Shahab 3 "a few weeks ago" that was "the final test before delivering the missile to the armed forces", according to a New York Times report.

On 9 November 2004, Shamkhani said Iran could mass-produce the missile.

On 2 November 2006, Iran fired unarmed missiles to begin 10 days of military war games. Iranian state television reported "dozens of missiles were fired including Shahab-2 and Shahab-3 missiles. These launches come after some United States-led military exercises in the Persian Gulf on 30 October 2006, meant to train for blocking the transport of weapons of mass destruction.

2008 Great Prophet III test

On 8 July 2008, Iran test fired a non-upgraded version of the Shahab-3 as one of 9 medium- and long-range missiles launched as part of the Great Prophet III exercise, within a few weeks of a recently concluded military exercise by Israel.

Other missiles fired include the surface-to-surface Fateh-110 and Zelzal missiles. Islamic Revolutionary Guard Corps air and naval units conducted these tests in a desert location. Air Force commander Hossein Salami advised that Iran was ready to retaliate to military threats, saying "We warn the enemies who intend to threaten us with military exercises and empty psychological operations that our hand will always be on the trigger and our missiles will always be ready to launch".

These tests were conducted at the Strait of Hormuz, which Iran has threatened to shut down traffic into if it is attacked. Independent national security webblog, ArmsControlWonk.com, analyzed Iranian launch footage and concluded that Iranian claims of testing an upgraded Shahab missile were unfounded. A senior Republican Guard commander said Iran would maintain security in the Strait of Hormuz and the Persian Gulf. Gen. Mohammad Hejazi, chief of the Guards' joint staff, called the missile tests a "defensive measure against invasions". He also said, Iran will not jeopardize the interests of neighboring countries. According to the Israeli newspaper Haaretz, the French news agency Agence France-Presse which published pictures from the missile test reported that "Iran had apparently doctored photographs of missile test-firings and exaggerated the capabilities of the weapons" and that an additional missile was added afterwards to cover up a failed launch".

In a sign of commercial fallout from the second missile test in two days, the French oil company Total S.A. announced the conditions were not right to invest in Iran as major oil companies have been under increasing political pressure from the United States and its allies over their activities in Iran amid mounting tensions over Iran's nuclear program. To ratchet up the pressure further, Israel also showed off its latest spy plane in what is seen as a display of strength in response to Iranian war games (missile tests).

The test on 8 July 2008 caused anxiety, the tests were seen widely as a response to Israeli aerial war games staged earlier in the month. Ali Shirazi, representative of the Revolutionary Guards naval forces said, warned that Iran would "set fire" to Israel and the U.S. Navy in the Persian Gulf as its first response to any pre-emptive strike by America or Israel over its nuclear program. Brig. Gen. Hoseyn Salami, commander of Iran's Revolutionary Guards' air force, said: "Our missiles are ready for shooting at any place and any time, quickly and with accuracy". He also made the statement that "enemy targets are under surveillance". Speaking on a visit to Malaysia on the first day of the tests, Iranian President Mahmoud Ahmadinejad dismissed the possibility of an attack by the United States or Israel as a "joke".

General Mohammad Hejazi, chief of the Guards' joint staff, called the missile tests a "defensive measure against invasions". He also said that Iran will not jeopardize the interests of neighboring countries.

The US government says that the Shahab-3 is "generally" less accurate than the Fateh-110.

Operators

Current operators

Aerospace Force of the Islamic Revolutionary Guard Corps

See also 
Military of Iran
Iranian military industry
Equipment of the Iranian Army

References

External links 

Shahab-3: an Advanced IRBM
Encyclopedia Astronautica
Iranian Missiles, from Sarbaz.org, website of former Iranian Imperial Army loyalists
Missile Threat CSIS - Shahab 3
Missile Threat CSIS - Shahab 3 Variants (Emad, Ghadr)
Shahab-3 MRBM from Military Periscope (login required)
Russia and the Development of the Iranian Missile Program
 Írán - Námořní cvičení—visual comparison of Shahab-3B and Fajr-3
Janes Defence Weekly Volume 43 and Issue 37 Iran's ballistic missile developments - long-range ambitions

Ballistic missiles of Iran
Surface-to-surface missiles of Iran
Medium-range ballistic missiles of Iran
Theatre ballistic missiles
Military equipment introduced in the 2000s